Epicrionops parkeri, or Parker's caecilian, is a species of caecilian in the family Rhinatrematidae endemic to Colombia. Its natural habitats are subtropical or tropical moist montane forests, rivers, and intermittent rivers.

References

Amphibians of Colombia
Epicrionops
Amphibians described in 1942
Endemic fauna of Colombia
Taxonomy articles created by Polbot